Parides chabrias is a species of butterfly in the family Papilionidae. It is found in Brazil (Amazonas), Ecuador and Peru. It is a woodland species. The female flies slowly near the ground, whilst the male has a swifter flight and generally remains at a considerable height. The larva feeds on Aristolochia burchelli and A. didyma.

Subspecies
Parides chabrias chabrias (Brazil: Amazonas, Ecuador, Peru) The forewing in both sexes has a row of submarginal spots, which however are often wanting in the female. The central area of the hindwing is situated somewhat further towards the margin than in ygdrasilla, consequently the cell-spot is smaller. A full description is provided by Rothschild, W. and Jordan, K. (1906)
Parides chabrias ygdrasilla Hemming, 1935 (Brazil: Pará, Guianas)

Taxonomy

Parides chabrias is a member of the chabrias species group.

The members are
Parides chabrias 
Parides coelus 
Parides hahneli 
Parides mithras 
Parides pizarro 
Parides quadratus

Etymology
Named in the Classical tradition for the Athenian general Chabrias.

References

Butterflies described in 1852
Parides
Papilionidae of South America